Pamela Denise Anderson (born July 1, 1967) is a Canadian-American actress, model, and media personality. She is best known for her glamour modeling work in Playboy magazine and for her role as "C.J." Parker on the television series Baywatch (1992–1997).

Anderson came to public prominence after being selected as the February 1990 Playmate of the Month for Playboy magazine. She went on to make regular appearances on the magazine's cover, holding the record for the most Playboy covers by any person. Anderson became known to a wider audience in 1991 when she appeared on the ABC sitcom Home Improvement, playing the role of Lisa for its first two seasons. She gained international recognition for her starring role as "C.J." Parker on the action drama series Baywatch (1992–1997), further cementing her status as a sex symbol. She played Vallery Irons on the syndicated series V.I.P. (1998–2002) and starred as Skyler Dayton on the Fox sitcom Stacked (2005–2006).

Anderson's film credits include Raw Justice (1994), Barb Wire (1996), Scary Movie 3 (2003), Superhero Movie, Blonde and Blonder (both 2008), The Institute, Baywatch (both 2017), and City Hunter (2018). She appeared in her own documentary series in 2008, which she also co-directed, and has taken part in numerous reality television shows from around the world, such as Dancing with the Stars (2010, 2012), Bailando (2011), VIP Brother (2012), Dancing on Ice (2013), and Danse avec les stars (2018).

Anderson has publicly supported various charitable causes, particularly animal rights, and has endorsed PETA activities. She has also released three autobiographies and four novels. Anderson was the recipient of a star on the Canadian Walk of Fame in 2006. She holds both American and Canadian citizenship.

Early life 

Anderson was born in Ladysmith, British Columbia, Canada, the daughter of Barry Anderson, a furnace repairman, and Carol, a waitress. He changed his name to Anderson when he arrived as an immigrant. Anderson also has Volga German ancestry on her mother's side; her grandmother, ethnically German, was born in Russia in a Mennonite village and immigrated to Canada in 1901. Anderson received press coverage right after her birth as a "Centennial Baby", having been born on July 1, 1967, the 100th anniversary of Canada's official founding via the Constitution Act, 1867.

She has a younger brother, Gerry (born 1971), an actor and producer who worked in some of her movies and TV shows (V.I.P., Stripperella, Stacked and Blonde and Blonder).

Anderson suffered sexual abuse as a child, a fact she revealed publicly in 2014. She said she was molested by a female babysitter from ages 6 to 10, raped by a 25-year-old man when she was age 12, and gang-raped by her boyfriend and six of his friends when she was 14.

Anderson attended Highland Secondary School in Comox, British Columbia. At high school, she played on the volleyball team. She graduated in 1985. In 1988, Anderson moved to Vancouver and worked as a fitness instructor.

Career

Early modelling 

In 1989, Anderson attended a BC Lions Canadian Football League game at the BC Place Stadium in Vancouver, where she was featured on the Jumbotron while wearing a Labatt's Beer T-shirt. The brewing company hired Anderson briefly as a spokesmodel. Inspired by the event, her then-boyfriend Dan Ilicic produced a poster of her image, entitled the Blue Zone Girl.

Anderson appeared as the cover girl on Playboy magazine's October 1989 issue. She subsequently moved to the United States, settling in Los Angeles to further pursue a modeling career. Playboy subsequently chose her as Playmate of the Month in their February 1990 issue, in which she appeared in the centerfold photo. Anderson then elected to have breast implant surgery, increasing her bust size to 34D. She increased her bust size again, to 34DD, several years later.

Anderson's Playboy career spans 22 years, and she has appeared on more Playboy covers than any other model. She has also made numerous appearances in the publication's newsstand specials. Anderson wrote the foreword in the Playboy coffee table book Playboy's Greatest Covers.

Entertainment career 

After Anderson moved to Los Angeles, she won a minor role as Lisa, the original "Tool Time Girl", on the ABC comedy series Home Improvement. She left the show after two seasons and won the role of C. J. Parker on Baywatch, which she played for five seasons between 1992 and 1997 making her one of the longest-serving cast members. This has been one of her best-known roles to date and has brought her popularity from international viewers. Anderson was paid US$1,500 per episode during the first season. By the end of her five-season run, she was making more than $300,000 an episode, one of the highest-paid TV actresses at the time. She reprised her role in a reunion movie, Baywatch: Hawaiian Wedding (2003), and also to appear in commercials for DirecTV in 2007. Anderson was still modeling for Outdoor Life and appearing on the cover of the magazine each year. In 1993, Anderson appeared in a music video "Can't Have Your Cake" by Vince Neil to promote his first solo album, Exposed.

In 1994, she was cast in her first starring film role, in Raw Justice, also known as Good Cop, Bad Cop, co-starring with Stacy Keach, David Keith, and Robert Hays. Under the alternate title, the film won the Bronze Award at the Worldfest-Charleston in the category for dramatic theatrical films.

In 1996, she played Barbara Rose Kopetski in the film Barb Wire. The movie, a thinly veiled futuristic remake of Casablanca, was not a commercial success. During filming she had barbed wire tattooed on her left upper arm instead of having it painted on by make-up artists every day, but had it removed in 2016.

In April 1997, she guest-hosted Saturday Night Live. She appeared on one of two covers for the September issue of Playboy.

In September 1998, Anderson starred as Vallery Irons in the Sony Pictures Television syndicated action/comedy-drama series V.I.P. created by J. F. Lawton. The series had a successful four-year run. In 1999, she appeared as a man-eating giantess in the music video for "Miserable" by California alternative rock band Lit. She appeared on The Nanny as Fran Fine's rival, Heather Biblow.

Sam Newman House, a pop architecture building constructed in 2001 in St Kilda, Victoria, Australia, has a large image of Anderson's face. Sam Newman commissioned local architect Cassandra Fahey to design the building, and used the image with Anderson's permission. Permits were issued retroactively when it became a major local landmark and won the award for Best New Residential Building in the RAIA Victorian Architecture Awards. Later that year, Anderson played herself in the Miller Lite TV commercial "Pillow Fight", the sequel to the brand's earlier commercial "Catfight", with models Tanya Ballinger and Kitana Baker reprising their roles.

In May 2004, Anderson appeared nude on the cover of Playboy magazine. Later, she posed naked for Stuff and GQ magazines. Anderson was also featured on the cover of the fashion magazines W, British Marie Claire, Flare, and Elle Canada and in editorials for Russian Elle and V.

In 2004, she released the book Star, co-written by Eric Shaw Quinn, about a teenager trying to become famous. After this, she began touring the United States, signing autographs for fans at Wal-Mart stores nationwide. Her second book, the sequel Star Struck, released in 2005, is a thinly veiled look at her life with Tommy Lee and the trials of celebrity life. In April 2005, Anderson starred in a new Fox comedy series Stacked as Skyler Dayton, a party girl who goes to work at a book store. It was canceled on May 18, 2006, after two seasons; some episodes were not broadcast. On August 14, 2005, Comedy Central created the Roast of Pamela Anderson.

Anderson was named most powerful Canadian in Hollywood in 2005.

In December 2005, NBC cut a video of Anderson pole dancing to Elton John's "The Red Piano", saying that the footage was inappropriate for prime time. The video was shown on huge screens during the event, while John played "The Bitch is Back". In March 2006, it was announced that Anderson would receive a star on Canada's Walk of Fame due to her many years as a model and actress, only the second model to receive a star. In April 2006, Anderson hosted Canada's Juno Awards, becoming the first non-singer and model to do so.

Anderson appeared in the 2006 mockumentary Borat: Cultural Learnings of America for Make Benefit Glorious Nation of Kazakhstan, in which the title character becomes obsessed with her and plans to abduct and marry her. She appears as herself at a book-signing at the end of the film, confronted by Borat in a staged botched abduction.

She performed on February 13–14, 2008, in a Valentine's Day strip-tease act at the Crazy Horse cabaret in Paris. Anderson then starred in Pam: Girl on the Loose, first shown on August 3, 2008, on E! in the United States.

In December 2009, Anderson guest-starred as Genie of the Lamp in the pantomime Aladdin at the New Wimbledon Theatre in Wimbledon, in southwest London. Anderson took over the role from comedian Ruby Wax, with former EastEnders actress Anita Dobson and comedian Paul O'Grady also booked for the role. In 2010, she appeared in the short film The Commuter directed by the McHenry Brothers and shot entirely on the Nokia N8 smartphone as promotion for the phone in the UK. Anderson was featured in a beach-themed editorial, shot by Mario Testino for Brazilian Vogues June 2013 "Body Issue".

On January 31, 2023, the documentary about her life Pamela, a Love Story, directed by Ryan White, was released on Netflix.

Theatre 

Anderson made her Broadway debut playing Roxie Hart in the Broadway production of Chicago for eight weeks from April 12, 2022 to June 5, 2022. It was her first time performing since 2019.

Reality television 

In November 2010, Anderson appeared on season 4 of Bigg Boss, the Indian version of the Big Brother television franchise. She stayed as a guest in the house for three days for a reported sum of Rs. 2.5 crores (approx US$550,000). Furthering her involvement in the franchise, Anderson took part in the 12th season of Big Brother in the United Kingdom in 2011. In 2012, she appeared as a Special Houseguest on the fourth season of VIP Brother, the celebrity spin-off of Big Brother in Bulgaria.

On Day 12 for the Promi Big Brother (season 1) in Germany, she entered the house, as a Special Guest Star on the final day. David Hasselhoff, a former Baywatch co-star, was a contestant on Days 1 to 5.

Dancing with the Stars around the world 

Anderson was a contestant on the tenth season of Dancing with the Stars, partnered with professional dancer Damian Whitewood. The season premiered on March 22, 2010. Anderson was eliminated after seven weeks. She also took part in the 15th season all-star edition in 2012 with Tristan MacManus. Anderson and MacManus were eliminated in the first week of competition.

In May 2011, she was a contestant on the Bailando 2011 (Argentina), partnered with professional dancer Damian Whitewood. She left the competition after 4 weeks.

In 2018, she was a contestant on the ninth season of French Dancing with the Stars. The season premiered on September 29, 2018. Anderson was eliminated on November 8, 2018.

Dancing on Ice 

In 2013, Anderson appeared on the eighth series of the British reality TV show Dancing on Ice, partnered with former winner Matt Evers.

Activism

Animal rights 

Anderson has been a vegetarian since childhood and vegan since her early twenties for ethical reasons and promotes the benefits of a plant-based diet.

Anderson became the center of controversy when she posed for a PETA ad wearing a bikini with sections drawn on her body dividing it into ribs, rump, shoulder, etc., like a diagram of meat cuts; the ad's tagline was "All Animals Have the Same Parts". The ad was banned in Montreal, Quebec, on grounds that it was sexist. Anderson retorted, "In a city that is known for its exotic dancing and for being progressive and edgy, how sad that a woman would be banned from using her own body in a political protest over the suffering of cows and chickens. In some parts of the world, women are forced to cover their whole bodies with burqas – is that next? I didn't think that Canada would be so puritanical."

She became a company spokesperson for FrogAds, Inc. in March 2012. In February 2014, she stripped for a Valentine's Day-themed ad for PETA, urging dog lovers to cuddle up with their pets during winter.

On July 8, 2015, Anderson wrote to Putin to save whales. On December 15, 2015, Anderson, representing the International Fund for Animal Welfare (IFAW), met with top Kremlin officials regarding animals rights in Russia. On December 15, 2016, Anderson and IFAW officials met with Kremlin officials to discuss animal welfare and conservation.

Anti-pornography 

Anderson has been critical of pornography. In 2016, she co-authored a viral Wall Street Journal opinion piece with Orthodox rabbi Shmuley Boteach, in which they called online pornography a "public hazard of unprecedented seriousness." The two called for a "sensual revolution" to replace "pornography with eroticism, the alloying of sex with love, of physicality with personality, of the body's mechanics with imagination, of orgasmic release with binding relationships." They later gave a joint lecture at Oxford University to over 1,000 people. Boteach observed: "It can be intimidating to talk about pornography and eroticism alongside an international sex symbol, but I think Pamela has handled it extremely well." The two also wrote a book together, Lust for Love (2018), about how meaningful, passionate sex has been declining, and called for a new sensual revolution that emphasizes partners connecting in the bedroom.

Julian Assange 

In December 2016, in a statement to People magazine, Anderson called WikiLeaks founder Julian Assange a "hero". She stated that he had done everyone "a great service" and that "[e]veryone in the world has benefited because of WikiLeaks," while decrying how "elaborate plots against him and made up sexual allegations could result in him being extradited to the US – where he would not be treated fairly – because of his exposure of truths." In April 2019, Anderson expressed anger on Twitter at Assange's expulsion from Ecuador's London embassy. In May 2019, Anderson visited Assange in Belmarsh prison with Kristinn Hrafnsson, and said she believed Assange to be innocent, saying, "He is a good man, he is an incredible person. I love him, I can't imagine what he has been going through."

In October 2019, Anderson announced she would be traveling to Australia in November 2019 to challenge Australian Prime Minister Scott Morrison to stand up for Assange. In her announcement, she referenced the 'disparaging remarks' he made about her in 2018 and challenged him to debate the matter "in front of the Australian people." She also wrote another letter to Morrison asking him to use his influence to secure Assange's release. Morrison replied with a letter, saying that his government would respect Britain's judicial process and Assange would not receive any special help. In the text of a speech she had intended to give at Parliament House, Canberra, Anderson said that Assange was suffering "psychological torture" in jail and that "every moment he is in there, he is in danger".

On January 18, 2021, Anderson spoke on the Fox News show Tucker Carlson Tonight, asking President Donald Trump to pardon Assange.

AIDS and other activism 

In March 2005, Anderson became a spokesperson for MAC Cosmetics's MAC AIDS Fund, which helped people affected by AIDS and HIV. After becoming the official spokesmodel, Anderson raised money during events in Toronto, Tokyo, Dublin, and Athens. Anderson became the celebrity spokesperson for the American Liver Foundation, and served as the Grand Marshal of the SOS motorcycle ride fundraiser.

In 2009, Anderson wrote an open letter to President Barack Obama urging the legalization of cannabis.

In December 2015, Anderson, a close friend of Sea Shepherd Conservation Society founder Paul Watson and a long-time supporter and advisory board member, became a full board member in order to further its efforts in opposing the hunting of whales.

In November 2016, Anderson starred in a video public service announcement produced by the National Limousine Association and the National Sexual Violence Resource Center as part of the Ride Responsibly initiative, titled The Driving Game, which aimed to shed light on the lack of universal driver regulations in the private ground transportation industry.

Anderson once again starred in a video public service announcement produced by the National Limousine Association in January 2018, this time in partnership with Promoting Awareness | Victim Empowerment (PAVE), as part of the Ride Responsibly initiative. Titled The Signs, the video pushes for passenger safety and universal driver regulations in the private ground transportation industry.

After supporting the yellow vests movement in France, Anderson attended a meeting of the European Spring with Yanis Varoufakis and Benoît Hamon. She appeared as a supporter on election posters of the German DiEM25 campaign in the run-up to the 2019 European Elections.

Anderson advocates for animal rights, and is an active member of the animal protection organization People for the Ethical Treatment of Animals (PETA). She gave up eating meat in her early teens when she saw a hanging dead deer that her father had shot.

In the 2019 Canadian federal election, she endorsed the Green Party of Canada.

Personal life

Relationships 

Anderson has been married six times. She married her first husband, Tommy Lee, drummer of Mötley Crüe, on February 19, 1995, after knowing him for only four days. They married on a beach, with Anderson in a white bikini. Anderson's mother did not know, and learned of the marriage from People magazine. During this time, she was known professionally as Pamela Anderson Lee. They have two sons together: Brandon Thomas (born June 5, 1996) and Dylan Jagger (born December 29, 1997). During their tumultuous marriage, Lee was sentenced to six months in the Los Angeles County Jail for spousal abuse after assaulting Anderson. The couple divorced in 1998. A long custody dispute over their sons followed, and was finalized when they were granted joint custody in October 2002.

In March 2002, Anderson publicly stated that she had contracted  by sharing tattoo needles with Lee, and began writing a regular column for Jane magazine. In October 2003, Anderson jokingly said on Howard Stern's radio show that she did not expect to live more than 10 or 15 years, but this was taken seriously by many websites and tabloids. By 2015 Anderson had been cured of hepatitis C.

After the divorce, Anderson became engaged to the model Marcus Schenkenberg; they broke up in 2001. She then became engaged to the singer Kid Rock; she broke up with him in 2003. On July 18, 2006, it was announced that she would marry Kid Rock on July 29, 2006, on a yacht near Saint-Tropez, France.

 "Feels like I've been stuck in a time warp," said Anderson in her blog entry. "Not able to let go of MY family picture ... it's been sad and lonely and frustrating ... I've raised my kids alone in hope of a miracle. Well my miracle came and went. And came back and back because he knew that I'd wake up one day and realize that I was waiting for nothing." "I'm moving on," she declared. "I feel like I'm finally free ... I'm in love."

There was extensive unconfirmed media speculation that the marriage was pregnancy-related, based on Anderson's representative's refusal to comment on the question.

On November 10, 2006, it was announced that Anderson had miscarried while in Vancouver shooting a new film, Blonde and Blonder. Seventeen days later, on November 27, 2006, Anderson filed for divorce in Los Angeles County Superior Court, citing irreconcilable differences. Some news reports had suggested that Kid Rock's outrage during a screening of Borat, in which Anderson has a cameo role, led to filing for divorce two weeks later.

In February 2007, Anderson said that she often had sex with Lee since their divorce. In June 2008, Lee said that they were trying to reconcile.

In September 2007, Anderson stated on The Ellen DeGeneres Show that she was engaged. On September 29, Anderson and Rick Salomon applied for a marriage license in Las Vegas. On October 6, 2007, Anderson married Salomon in a small wedding ceremony at The Mirage, between her two nightly appearances at the Planet Hollywood Resort and Casino in Hans Klok's magic show. The couple separated on December 13, and on February 22, 2008, Anderson requested through the courts that the marriage be annulled, citing fraud.

In October 2013, Anderson stated on The Ellen DeGeneres Show that she and Salomon were "friends with benefits". In January 2014, she announced that she had remarried Salomon on an unspecified date. Anderson filed for divorce from Salomon in February 2015. The divorce was finalized on April 29, 2015.

Anderson began dating French footballer Adil Rami in 2017. In late June 2019, Anderson declared on an Instagram post that the relationship with Rami was over. On January 20, 2020 Anderson married Hollywood producer Jon Peters. On February 1, 2020, Anderson announced she and Peters had separated, and later claimed to have never been legally married to Peters. On December 24, 2020, Anderson married Dan Hayhurst, her bodyguard. On January 21, 2022, Anderson announced that she had split with Hayhurst.

Legal issues 

A sex tape of Anderson and Tommy Lee filmed on a houseboat on Lake Mead was stolen from their home in 1995 and was widely distributed on the internet. Anderson sued the video distribution company, Internet Entertainment Group, who posted the video on their website ClubLove in November 1997. Anderson was pregnant during the trial and, fearful of the extreme stress causing harm to her pregnancy, dismissed the case. Thereafter, the company began making the tape available to subscribers to its websites again, resulting in triple the normal traffic on the sites. It was said the Lees entered a confidential agreement over releasing rights to the video, but Pamela said that was not true on her 2023 Netflix documentary Pamela, a Love Story. Another tape, which was made before the Tommy Lee tape, involving Anderson and musician Bret Michaels from Poison, was later announced. Frames of the video first appeared in Penthouse magazine in March 1998. After Poison's and Michaels' longtime attorney, Ed McPherson, obtained a federal injunction prohibiting the distribution of the explicit sex tape that the couple made, an abridged version of the tape appeared on the internet in 1998.

The story of the sex tape was later portrayed in the 2022 miniseries Pam & Tommy. Anderson was repeatedly contacted by the producers and the actress, Lily James, portraying her, to get input and permission, but never answered their calls.

Anderson revealed that she was not asked if she approved of the series. She stated "I've got nothing against Lily James. I think that she's a beautiful girl and she was just doing the job. But the idea of the whole thing happening was just really crushing for me."

Citizenship and homes 

Anderson became a naturalized citizen of the United States in 2004, while retaining her Canadian citizenship. After moving to California in 1989, Anderson felt that it was important to become an American citizen in order to vote and one day petition to bring her parents to the U.S. and care for them when they were older. Anderson purchased a beach home in Malibu, California, for $1.8 million in 2008 and attempted to sell it in 2013 for $7.75 million, but later took it off the market. Since then, she has been renting out her Malibu home for $50,000 per month and has moved to the French Riviera, mainly because of her relationship with football player Adil Rami. Anderson previously lived in a mansion in Cassis, in the commune of Marseille, France. In 2019 Anderson said that she had recently returned to her native Canada, residing on Vancouver Island. Her move to Canada became permanent in 2021. In 2021 Anderson sold the home facing Malibu Lagoon State Beach.

Filmography

Film

Television

Music videos

Dancing with the Stars

Season 10 performances

Season 15 performances

Danse avec les stars

In 2018, Anderson participated in the ninth season of Danse avec les stars – the French version of Dancing with the Stars. She was partnered with professional dancer Maxime Dereymez. On November 8, 2018, they were eliminated finishing 5th out of 11 contestants.

In week 2, each couple have an imposed figure, if they succeed, they got 5 bonus points.

In week 4, Anderson was injured and so did not perform.

Awards and nominations

Bibliography

Autobiographies

Nonfiction 

 Lust for Love: Rekindling Intimacy and Passion in Your Relationship (co-writer with Shmuley Boteach) (2018)
 
Contributors: Pamela Anderson, Julian Assange, Renata Avila, Katrin Axelsson, Franco "Bifo" Berardi, Sally Burch, Noam Chomsky, Patrick Cockburn, Naomi Colvin, The Courage Foundation, Mark Curtis, Daniel Ellsberg, Teresa Forcades i Vila, Charles Glass, Kevin Gosztola, Serge Halimi, Nozomi Hayase, Chris Hedges, Srećko Horvat, Caitlin Johnstone, Margaret Kimberley, Geoffroy de Lagasnerie, Lisa Longstaff, Alan MacLeod, Stefania Maurizi, Craig Murray, Fidel Narváez, John C. O'Day, John Pilger, Jesselyn Radack, Michael Ratner, Angela Richter, Geoffrey Robertson, Jennifer Robinson, Matt Taibbi, Natalia Viana, Ai Weiwei, Vivienne Westwood and Slavoj Žižek.

Novels

See also 

 List of Canadian actors
 List of animal rights advocates

References

Further reading

External links 

  – official site
 
 
 Pamela Anderson at Playboy online

1967 births
Living people
1990s Playboy Playmates
20th-century Canadian actresses
21st-century American actresses
21st-century Canadian actresses
Actresses from British Columbia
Actresses from Malibu, California
American cannabis activists
American female models
American film actresses
American people of Finnish descent
American people of Russian descent
American television actresses
American women television personalities
American victims of crime
American voice actresses
American animal rights activists
Anti-pornography activists
Association footballers' wives and girlfriends
Bailando por un Sueño (Argentine TV series) participants
Canadian cannabis activists
Canadian emigrants to the United States
Canadian film actresses
Canadian people of Finnish descent
Canadian people of Russian descent
Canadian television actresses
Canadian victims of crime
Canadian voice actresses
Female models from British Columbia
HIV/AIDS activists
Naturalized citizens of the United States
People from Ladysmith, British Columbia
Sexual abuse victim advocates
Volga German people